Nuno Filipe Rodrigues Laranjeiro (born 18 January 1983) is a Portuguese former professional footballer who played as a right or left back, currently the sporting director of C.D. Fátima.

He played 145 Primeira Liga matches over nine seasons (four goals), at the service of União de Leiria (seven years) and Leixões (two).

Club career
Born in Ourém, Santarém District, Laranjeiro started his career at U.D. Leiria in 2001–02, becoming a first-team regular two seasons later, with the club always in the Primeira Liga.

In the 2007–08 campaign, he scored two goals from the penalty spot in the UEFA Intertoto Cup match against FK Hajduk Kula, as his team made it to the UEFA Cup on a 4–2 aggregate (1–0 defeat, 4–1 home win).

In August 2008, upon Leiria's relegation, Laranjeiro joined another top-flight struggler, Matosinhos' Leixões SC, starting most of his debut season to help them finish in sixth position. After only eight second level matches in 2010–11, he left the club and signed for C.D. Fátima of division three.

Until his retirement in 2019 at the age of 36, Laranjeiro competed mainly in the second and third tiers, representing S.C. Freamunde, G.D. Chaves, Leiria and Fátima. Immediately afterwards, he was appointed his last club's director of football.

References

External links

1983 births
Living people
People from Ourém
Portuguese footballers
Association football defenders
Primeira Liga players
Liga Portugal 2 players
Segunda Divisão players
U.D. Leiria players
Leixões S.C. players
C.D. Fátima players
S.C. Freamunde players
G.D. Chaves players
Portugal youth international footballers
Portugal under-21 international footballers
Sportspeople from Santarém District